The 2016 Tour of Flanders for Women was the 13th running of the women's Tour of Flanders, a women's bicycle race in Belgium. Britain's Lizzie Armitstead won the race in a two-woman sprint with Sweden's Emma Johansson.

Race Summary
Emma Johansson accelerated on the top of Oude Kwaremont, 17 km from the finish, followed by Lizzie Armitstead. The duo powered on over the Paterberg and held a small lead over a group of eight until the finish. In the sprint, Armitstead narrowly beat Johansson at the line.

Results

References

Tour of Flanders for Women
Flanders
Flanders